Dušan Radojčić (1931 – 5 May 1999), was a Serbian basketball player and coach. He represented the Yugoslavia national basketball team internationally.

Playing career 
Radojčić spent most of his playing career with Proleter Zrenjanin of the Yugoslav Basketball League. He played the 1952 season for a Belgrade-based team Partizan. 

During his second stint with Proleter he won the National Championships in the 1956 season. Radojčić was a part of the group of players known as the Proleter's Five, which included himself, Milutin Minja, Ljubomir Katić, Lajos Engler, and Vilmos Lóczi.

National team career
Radojčić was a member of the Yugoslavia national team that participated at the 1950 FIBA World Championship in Buenos Aires, Argentina. He played one game at the tournament and scored 2 points.

Coaching career 
Radojčić coached Zrenjanin-based teams Kombinat and Mašinac, as well as Žitište-based team Plastika.

Career achievements and awards 
 Yugoslav League champion: 1 (with Proleter Zrenjanin: 1956).
 Plaque of the Basketball Federation of Serbia (2016, posthumous)

Personal life 
Radojčić briefly played handball for the Proleter handball team in 1949. His son Dragan played basketball.

In popular culture 
 The 2016 Serbian documentary Šampioni iz pedeset i šeste portrays Radojčić and the achievements of the Proleter basketball team in the mid 1950s and how they won the Yugoslav Championship in 1956.

References

1931 births
1999 deaths
Guards (basketball)
KK Partizan players
KK Proleter Zrenjanin coaches
KK Proleter Zrenjanin players
Serbian men's basketball players
Serbian men's basketball coaches
Yugoslav male handball players
Yugoslav men's basketball players
Yugoslav basketball coaches
1950 FIBA World Championship players
Date of birth missing
Place of birth missing
Place of death missing